The Bras Saint-Nicolas (in English: Saint-Nicolas Arm) is a tributary of the south-eastern bank of the rivière du Sud (Montmagny), which flows north-east to the south bank of the St. Lawrence River.

The Bras Saint-Nicolas flows in the municipalities of Sainte-Apolline-de-Patton, Cap-Saint-Ignace, Saint-Cyrille-de-Lessard, Saint-Eugène, Notre-Dame-de-Bonsecours and Montmagny, in the Montmagny Regional County Municipality, in the administrative region of Chaudière-Appalaches, in Quebec, in Canada.

Geography 

The main neighboring watersheds of Bras Saint-Nicolas are:
 north side: St. Lawrence River, Tortue River (L'Islet);
 east side: rivière des Perdrix, brook Guimont, Bras du Nord-Est, Trois Saumons River;
 south side: Paul brook, Le Grand Ruisseau, Cloutier River, Morigeau River, rivière des Poitras, rivière du Sud (Montmagny), rivière des Perdrix;
 west side: rivière du Sud (Montmagny).

The Bras Saint-Nicolas has its source at the confluence of the Méchant Pouce River and Fortin stream, in the municipality of Sainte-Apolline-de-Patton. This spring is located on the west side of the hamlet "L'Espérance", on the north slope of the Notre Dame Mountains.

Upper course of the river
  northwesterly in Sainte-Apolline-de-Patton, to the bridge at the municipal boundary of Cap-Saint-Ignace;
  northward in Cap-Saint-Ignace, collecting water from the Cloutier River, to a forest road;
  towards the north-west in Cap-Saint-Ignace, collecting the discharge of Isidore lake (coming from the east), up to the municipal limit of Saint-Cyrille-de-Lessard;
  north in Saint-Cyrille-de-Lessard, collecting water from the Guimont stream and Bras d'Apic, crossing a series of waterfalls and rapids, up to the municipal limit of Saint-Eugène;
  north-west, collecting water from Bras de Riche, until you reach a road;

Lower course of the river
  west, to a road;
  southwesterly in Saint-Eugène, to the municipal limit of Cap-Saint-Ignace;
  southwesterly in Cap-Saint-Ignace, to the highway 20 bridge;
  west, up to the bridge;
  towards the southwest, passing south of the village of Cap-Saint-Ignace, to the road;
  southwesterly, along highway 20, to a road bridge;
  southwesterly in Cap-Saint-Ignace, to the municipal limit of Montmagny;
  towards the south-west, collecting the waters of the rivière des Perdrix (coming from the south-east), then towards the northwest to its confluence.

The Bras Saint-Nicolas empties onto the south-eastern bank of the rivière du Sud (Montmagny). This confluence is located upstream from the route 132 bridge, downstream from the route 283 bridge, in the heart of the village of Montmagny.

Toponymy 
In a lower segment, parallel to the St. Lawrence River, the Bras Saint-Nicolas meanders at an altitude of about fifteen meters, crossing a stronghold granted in 1672 to Nicolas Gamache by the intendant Jean Talon. A first hypothesis associates the origin of the toponym "Bras Saint-Nicolas" with this pioneer. Another hypothesis is rather referred to other to Nicolas Després, father of Geneviève Després whose husband, Louis Couillard de Lespinay, had bought the seigneury of Rivière-du-Sud in 1654 and 1655.

In 1802, the toponym “R. St. Nicholas' appears on a map by surveyor Samuel Holland. In 1803, the toponym appeared on a map of Vondenvelden with the generic Bras. In 1815, Joseph Bouchette also identified it by the same generic, a term used to designate a tributary or a subdivision of a watercourse.

The toponym "Bras Saint-Nicolas" was made official on December 5, 1968, at the Commission de toponymie du Québec.

List of bridges

References

See also 

 St. Lawrence River
 Rivière du Sud (Montmagny), a stream
 Sainte-Apolline-de-Patton, a municipality
 Cap-Saint-Ignace, a municipality
 Saint-Cyrille-de-Lessard, a municipality
 Saint-Eugène, a municipality
 Notre-Dame-de-Bonsecours, a municipality
 Montmagny, a municipality
 Montmagny Regional County Municipality (MRC)

Rivers of Chaudière-Appalaches
Montmagny Regional County Municipality